CBSE may refer to:

CBSé, an Argentine beverage company
CBSE-FM, an FM radio station licensed to Sept-Îles, Quebec, Canada
Central Board of Secondary Education, a national-level board of education in India for public and private schools
Component-based software engineering, a branch of software engineering